Roland Thomas Woodhouse (15 January 1897 – 1969) was an English professional footballer who played as an inside forward. He made appearances in the Football League for Preston North End, Everton, Wrexham and Halifax Town. Whilst at Preston North End, Woodhouse played in the 1922 FA Cup Final.

References

1897 births
1969 deaths
English footballers
Association football forwards
English Football League players
Preston North End F.C. players
Everton F.C. players
Wrexham A.F.C. players
Halifax Town A.F.C. players
People from Leyland, Lancashire
FA Cup Final players